Elaphropus milneanus is a species of ground beetle in the subfamily Trechinae. It was described by Darlington in 1962.

References

Beetles described in 1962